Carl Th. Dreyer: My Metier is a 1995 Danish documentary film directed by  about the film career of Carl Theodor Dreyer.

References

External links 
 
 Thoughts on My Métier an essay by Carl Theodor Dreyer at the Criterion Collection

1995 films
Carl Theodor Dreyer
Danish black-and-white films
1990s Danish-language films
Documentary films about film directors and producers
Danish documentary films
1995 documentary films
Best Documentary Bodil Award winners
Best Documentary Robert Award winners